BAM15 is a novel mitochondrial protonophore uncoupler capable of protecting mammals from acute renal ischemic-reperfusion injury and cold-induced microtubule damage.

References

External links 
 Fat-fighting molecule sees the body burn more fuel

Oxadiazoles
Pyrazines
Bicyclic compounds
Fluoroarenes
Anilines
Secondary amines